K-27 is an approximately  north–south state highway that parallels Kansas' western border with Colorado. It is the westernmost north–south state highway in the state. It begins at U.S. Route 56 (US-56) in Elkhart near the Oklahoma state line and travels through the seven counties that border Colorado until reaching its northern terminus north of St. Francis, where it ends at the Nebraska state line (effectively becoming like-numbered Nebraska Highway 27). Along the way, it intersects several major highways, including US-160 in Johnson City, US-50 and US-400 in Syracuse, US-40 in Sharon Springs, Interstate 70 (I-70) and US-24 in Goodland, and US-36 in Wheeler. The section from US-40 north to Nebraska, is designated as the Land and Sky Scenic Byway. K-27 changes time zones twice, during its trek through Kansas, the only highway in the state to do so.

Before state highways were numbered in Kansas there were auto trails. The section of K-27 from Elkhart to the beginning of the overlap with K-51 was a part of the former Dallas–Canadian–Denver Highway. In Syracuse, the highway crosses the former National Old Trails Road, Old Santa Fe Trail and New Santa Fe Trail and Albert Pike Highway. In Tribune, K-27 crosses the former Kansas–Colorado Boulevard. In Sharon Springs the highway crosses the former Union Pacific Highway. Then further north in Goodland K-27 crosses the former Golden Belt, former Kansas White Way, former Blue Line, and former Pikes Peak Ocean to Ocean Highway. The route that K-27 follows was first designated as a state highway in 1926, as K-25. At that time it ran from the Elkhart, north to the Nebraska border. By 1927, it was renumbered to K-27. In 1955, K-27 was extended from Elkhart, south to the Oklahoma border. Then in 2004, it was realigned to intersect US-56 northeast of Elkhart.

Route description
K-27 changes time zones twice, during its trek through Kansas, the only highway in the state to do so. From the southern terminus, Central Standard Time is observed in Morton and Stanton counties, but the time zone changes to Mountain Standard Time when the highway crosses from Stanton into Hamilton County. Hamilton and the next three counties to the north (Greeley, Wallace, and Sherman) observe Mountain time, but clocks revert to Central Time at the Sherman County-Cheyenne County line.

The Kansas Department of Transportation (KDOT) tracks the traffic levels on its highways, and in 2018, they determined that on average the traffic varied from 410 vehicles per day just north of the southern overlap with K-51 to 4,410 vehicles per day in the city of Goodland. The only section of K-27 included in the National Highway System is its overlap with US-50 and US-400. The National Highway System is a system of highways important to the nation's defense, economy, and mobility. K-27 also connects to the National Highway System at its junction with I-70 and US-24.

Morton and Stanton counties
K-27 begins at US-56 northeast of Elkhart, crosses the Cimarron Valley Railroad, and then curves to the west. After about  the road curves to the north then crosses Happy Ditch about  later. The highway continues north through flat rural farmlands for roughly  then crosses the Cimarron River. From here the roadway continues another , where it begins an overlap with K-51, the only overlap with another state highway. The two routes continue north through flat farmlands for approximately  then cross an unnamed creek. K-27 and K-51 advance north for about  then crosses North Fork Cimarron River. About  past the river the highway curves east at Road 9. The roadway continues through farmlands for roughly  then begins to border the city of Richfield as South Boulevard.

About  later K-27 turns north onto Main Street, as K-51 continues east. The highway continues on for about  then curves northeast and enters into Stanton County. K-27 continues north from here for approximately  then crosses Bear Creek. The highway passes through more flat farmlands for  then enters into Hamilton County.

Hamilton and Greeley counties

Just inside the county, K-27 crosses Little Bear Creek, and continues north. The highway passes through flat farmland and grassland for about  then crosses the Arkansas River. K-27 then enters the city of Syracuse as Main Street. A few blocks later the road has an at-grade crossing with a BNSF Railway track and then intersects US-50 and US-400, known as A Avenue. At this point K-27 turns west and begins to overlap US-50 and US-400. At the western city line, K-27 turns north onto McDow Street as US-50 and US-400 continue west. K-27 continues north through flat rural farmlands for about  then crosses Syracuse Creek. The highway advances north another  and crosses Sand Creek. The highway then curves northeast and enters into Greeley County. The highway crosses the Kansas and Oklahoma Railroad as it continues north through the city. As K-27 leaves Tribune it crosses White Woman Creek and continues north. The highway passes through flat rural farmland for approximately  then curves northeast and crosses South Ladder Creek. The road then curves north and enters into Wallace County.

Wallace County
As the road enters the county, it soon crosses Middle Ladder Creek. The highway continues through flat rural farmland for around  then crosses Rose Creek. K-27 then crosses North Fork Rose Creek and curves northwest. The highway curves back north and continues though flat lands for around  then enters Sharon Springs as Main Street. Within the city, the road crosses Eagletail Creek and a Union Pacific Railway before intersecting US-40. K-27 turns east and follows US-40 for a brief distance, then turns back north. Here the Land and Sky Scenic Byway begins and follows K-27. The highway exits the city and after about  crosses the Smoky Hill River. From here, the roadway continues for a short distance, then shifts  to the east through an s-curve. K-27 proceeds north through farmland for around  then crosses Pond Creek. The highway continues for  then crosses South Fork Lake Creek. The road curves north and passes through flat farmland for approximately  then crosses into Sherman County.

Sherman and Cheyenne counties
K-27 continues for  then curves slightly northeast and crosses the North Fork Smoky Hill River. The highway curves northwest for a slight distance then curves and resumes its northern course. The highway soon reaches I-70 and US-24 at a diamond interchange. K-27 begins to overlap US-24 Business as it continues north. After , US-24 Business leaves to the east, as K-27 continues north out of the city limits. The highway crosses a Kyle Railroad track and continues along the west side of Goodland. The highway then curves northeast and begins to follow Middle Fork Sappa Creek. After about  K-27 crosses Middle Fork Horse Draw then curves north. The road continues for  then crosses Middle Beaver Creek. K-27 advances north through flat farmlands for roughly  then curves northwest and enters into Cheyenne County.

As the highway enters the county, it curves northward again, and after  crosses Little Beaver Creek. The road continues through rural farmland for around  then intersects US-36 and the southern terminus of former K-217. At this point K-27 turns west and begins to overlap US-36. The two routes cross Sand Creek  later then curve northwest. K-27 and US-36 then enter St. Francis as they curve west. The highway exits the city and soon crosses the South Fork Republican River. K-27 then turns north as US-36 continues west toward Colorado. K-27 advances north through rolling hills for about  then curves northwest and crosses Cherry Creek  later. The highway then curves north and passes through a combination of rolling hills and flat farmland for  then crosses Fish Creek. K-27 then curves west and continues for roughly  then curves back north. The road advances north through farmlands for around  then the landscape transitions to rolling hills.

History

Early roads
Before state highways were numbered in Kansas there were auto trails, which were an informal network of marked routes that existed in the United States and Canada in the early part of the 20th century. The section of K-27 from Elkhart to the beginning of the overlap with K-51 was a part of the former Dallas–Canadian–Denver Highway, which went from Boulder, Colorado to Galveston, Texas. In Syracuse, the highway crosses the former National Old Trails Road, Old Santa Fe Trail and New Santa Fe Trail as well as the Albert Pike Highway, which ran from Colorado Springs, Colorado. to Hot Springs, Arkansas. In Tribune, K-27 crosses the former Kansas–Colorado Boulevard. In Sharon Springs the highway crosses the former Union Pacific Highway. Then further north in Goodland K-27 crosses the former Golden Belt, which began in Denver and went east to Kansas City; the former Kansas White Way, which went from Colorado Springs, Colorado, to St. Joseph, Missouri; former Blue Line, which went from Limon, Colorado to Junction City, Kansas; former Roosevelt National Highway; and former Pikes Peak Ocean to Ocean Highway, which was formed in 1912, and went from New York City to Los Angeles.

Establishment

The route that K-27 follows was first designated as a state highway in 1926, as K-25. At that time it ran from the Oklahoma state line, north then east to Richfield. It then turned north and intersected K-46 then US-50 shortly after in Syracuse. It then continued north to K-96 in Tribune, then reached US-340 in Sharon Springs. It continued north, intersecting US-40 in Goodland, before reaching K-2 by Wheeler. K-2 and K-25 then overlapped from Wheeler to St Francis. In St Francis the two routes split, and K-25 headed north and soon crossed into Nebraska. The county engineer of Morton County ordered signs in January 1926. By 1927, the highway was renumbered as K-27. Also, US-340 was renumbered to US-40S and US-40 was renumbered to US-40N.

Realignments
In a July 23, 1935 resolution, the alignment of K-27 was straightened to eliminate sharp curves, within Sharon Springs. On June 6, 1936, it was approved to slightly realign K-27 in Stanton in Stanton County. In a January 26, 1937 state highway commission meeting, it was approved to realign K-27 where it crosses the Smoky Hill River, in order to eliminate a bad drainage condition caused by several small branches converging with the main river. Between February 1937 and January 1938, US-270 was extended into Kansas, and overlapped K-27 from Johnson north to US-50 in Syracuse, where it terminated. KDOT requested that US-270 be extended north along K-27 to I-70 south of Goodland. This request was denied by the American Association of State Highway Officials in an October 14, 1967 meeting. In a November 14, 1980 AASHTO meeting, a request by KDOT was approved to truncate US-270 to its current terminus in Liberal. Then in a May 18, 1981 state highway commission meeting, it was approved by the state to truncate US-270 to Liberal and the designation was removed from K-27. In a March 20, 1937 resolution, the intersection with K-96 in tribune was reconstructed. On March 18, 1940, it was approved to slightly realign K-27 within Richfield and Stanton in Morton County, to eliminate several sharp curves. Before 1950, K-27 zigzagged from St. Francis northwestward. On September 27, 1950, the state highway commission approved to realign K-27 in Goodland. Then in an October 14, 1953 resolution, the latter K-27 realignment was moved further northward to run along 8th Street in Goodland. This new alignment was completed by 1954. Then by 1970, it was realigned in Goodland again to its modern-day alignment.

On June 2, 1954, it was approved to slightly straighten the alignment of K-27, slightly south of the Nebraska border, to eliminate several sharp curves.

In a November 14, 1956 resolution, a  connector road was built from K-27 east to US-56, and designated as K-127. K-127 was decommissioned by 1959, as the city of Elkhart had annexed all the land around the highway, which is against Kansas law.

In a June 7, 1966 State Highway Commission meeting, the interchange with I-70 was designated, K-27 Spur was designated, and US-24 was realigned to overlap the new I-70. Then in an April 1, 1981 resolution, K-27 Spur was renumbered to US-24 Business in Goodland. On a May 3, 1996, the state approved to extend US-400 west, and was added to the overlap with US-50 in Syracuse. Before 2004, K-27 travelled through the west side of Elkhart to the Oklahoma border. On May 21, 2004, KDOT approved to realign K-27 north of Elkhart. The new  realignment intersected US-56 northeast of Elkhart. In a December 22, 2015 resolution, the highway was realigned south of Sharon Springs, where it crossed Rose Creek and North Fork Rose Creek.

Major intersections

K-27 Spur

K-27 Spur was a  connection between K-27 and I-70 / US 24 in Goodland. In a June 7, 1966 resolution, when US-24 was moved onto I-70, and K-27 Spur was designated along the old alignment of US-24. K-27 Spur was decommissioned in an April 1, 1981 resolution, and became a part of US-24 Business.

Major junctions

See also

 List of state highways in Kansas
 List of state highway spurs in Kansas

References

External links

 Kansas Department of Transportation State Map
 KDOT: Historic State Maps

027
Transportation in Morton County, Kansas
Transportation in Stanton County, Kansas
Transportation in Hamilton County, Kansas
Transportation in Greeley County, Kansas
Transportation in Wallace County, Kansas
Transportation in Sherman County, Kansas
Transportation in Cheyenne County, Kansas